"Sugar Chile" Robinson, Billie Holiday, Count Basie and His Sextet is a 1950 short film presenting five jazz numbers in a 15-minute running time. The film includes Billie Holiday performing "God Bless the Child" and "Now, Baby or Never", the Count Basie Sextet performing "One O'Clock Jump", and juvenile performer Frank "Sugar Chile" Robinson performing "Numbers Boogie" and "After School Boogie". The film was directed by Will Cowan and produced and released by Universal-International Pictures.

References

External links
 

1950 films
African-American films
Jazz films
Billie Holiday
Count Basie
Universal Pictures short films
American black-and-white films